Saint Clair High School may refer to:

 St. Clair High School (Missouri), Saint Clair, Missouri
 St. Clair High School (Michigan), East China School District, East China Township, Michigan
 Upper St. Clair High School, Upper St. Clair Township, Pennsylvania